Mysarbia is a Neotropical genus of firetips in the family Hesperiidae. The genus is monotypic containing the single species Mysarbia sejanus.

Subspecies
Mysarbia sejanus sejanus Peru
Mysarbia sejanus erythrostigma (Röber, 1925) Bolivia
Mysarbia sejanus stolli Mielke & Casagrande, 2002 Costa Rica, Venezuela, Colombia, Suriname, French Guiana

References
Mysarbia - Natural History Museum Lepidoptera genus database

External links
images representing Mysarbia at Consortium for the Barcode of Life

Hesperiidae
Hesperiidae of South America
Monotypic butterfly genera
Hesperiidae genera